The Leslie-Lohman Museum of Art (LLM), formerly the Leslie-Lohman Museum of Gay and Lesbian Art, is a visual art museum in SoHo, Lower Manhattan, New York City. It mainly collects, preserves and exhibits visual arts created by LGBTQ artists or art about LGBTQ+ themes, issues, and people. The museum, operated by the Leslie-Lohman Gay Art Foundation, offers exhibitions year-round in numerous locations and owns more than 22,000 objects, including, paintings, drawings, photography, prints and sculpture. It has been recognized as one of the oldest arts groups engaged in the collection and preservation of gay art. The foundation was awarded Museum status by the New York State Board of Regents in 2011 and was formally accredited as a museum in 2016. The museum is a member of the American Alliance of Museums and operates pursuant to their guidelines. As of 2019, the LLM was the only museum in the world dedicated to artwork documenting the LGBTQ experience.

The museum maintains a Permanent Collection into which more than 1,300 objects have been accessioned. The Permanent Collection contains works by a number of well-known gay artists such as Berenice Abbott, Abel Azcona, David Hockney, Ingo Swann, Catherine Opie, Andy Warhol, Tom of Finland, Delmas Howe, Jean Cocteau, David Wojnarowicz, Robert Mapplethorpe, George Platt Lynes, Horst, Duncan Grant, James Bidgood, Duane Michals, Charles Demuth, Don Bachardy, Attila Richard Lukacs, Jim French, Del LaGrace Volcano, Paul Thek, Peter Hujar, Arthur Tress and many others.

Mission
The Leslie-Lohman Museum of Art provides a platform for artistic exploration through multi-faceted queer perspectives. We embrace the power of the arts to inspire, explore, and foster understanding of the rich diversity of LGBTQ+ experiences.

Background
The Leslie-Lohman Gay Art Foundation was founded by J. Frederic "Fritz" Lohman and Charles W. Leslie. The two men had been collecting art for several years, and mounted their first exhibition of gay art in their loft on Prince Street in New York City in 1969. They opened a commercial art gallery shortly thereafter, but this venue closed in the early 1980s at the advent of the AIDS pandemic.

In 1987, the two men applied for nonprofit status as a precursor to establishing a foundation to preserve their collection of gay art and continue exhibition efforts. The Internal Revenue Service objected to the word "gay" in the title of the foundation and held up the nonprofit application for several years. The foundation was granted nonprofit status in 1990.

The Leslie-Lohman Gay Art Foundation's first location was in a basement at 127B Prince Street in New York City. In 2006, the foundation moved into a ground floor gallery at 26 Wooster Street in historic SoHo; gallery space will be expanding in size in 2016–2017.

Programs
The museum offers several principle programs, including the maintenance of its Permanent and Study Collections, 6–8 annual exhibitions at 26 Wooster Street, 4–6 annual exhibitions in the Wooster Street Windows Gallery, and multiple weekend exhibitions and drawing workshops at its Prince Street Project Space at 127b Prince Street in SoHo. The museum's exhibitions are organized by Guest Curators who submit proposals which are reviewed by the museum director and Exhibition Committee.

In addition, the museum offers a complete year-round schedule of educational programing, including talks, lectures (Slava Mogutin, Duane Michals, Catherine Opie, Jonathan David Katz, etc.), films and books signings. The LLGAF also publishes The Archive made available to its membership that includes information on the Leslie-Lohman collection, new acquisitions, events, and articles on artists and exhibitions. The museum has a library with more than 2,500 volumes on gay art and maintains files on more than 2,000 individual artists. The museum has begun to travel its exhibitions as its 2013 Sascha Schneider exhibition traveled to the Schwules Museum in Berlin. The museum's Classical Nude: The Making of Queer History was on preview at the ONE National Gay & Lesbian Archives gallery in West Hollywood in the summer of 2014.

The museum makes objects in its collection available for loan to qualified organizations and in recent years has borrowed works from other institutions, including the Library of Congress, Smithsonian Institution. New York Public Library, The Andy Warhol Museum, and other organizations.

Governance and finances
The Leslie-Lohman Museum is governed by an independent Board of Directors. The foundation employs a full-time staff, and relies on the assistance of volunteers to implement its programs. The museum also runs a Fellowship Program. It is financed by its endowment, contributions from private donors and foundations as well as a membership program. The foundation expands its collection primarily by donations from artists and collectors.

See also

 LGBT culture in New York City

References

Sources

Aletti, Vince. "Patrick Angus at the Leslie-Lohman Gay Art Foundation." The Village Voice. February 4–10, 2004.
Cotter, Holland. "Gay Pride (and Anguish) Around the Galleries." New York Times. June 24, 1994.
Clarke, Kevin. "The Art of Looking: The Life and Treasures of Collector Charles Leslie" 256 Pages, Bruno Gmuender 2015.
De Stefano, George. "Artistic Outlaws: Leslie and Lohman Have Fought to Preserve Gay Art for Three Decades." New York Blade. March 20, 1998.
Ellis, Alan. "Arts and Education." In The Harvey Milk Institute Guide to Lesbian, Gay, Bisexual, Transgender, and Queer Internet Research. Alan Ellis, Liz Highley, Kevin Schaub, Melissa White, and Liz Highleyman, eds. Binghamton, N.Y.: Haworth Press, 2001. 
Kennedy, Sean. "Lust At Last: At Age 70, Illustrator Bob Ziering Shows His Gay Erotic Art for the First Time." The Advocate. August 17, 2004.
Lee, Nathan. "The Week Ahead: Jan. 22 - Jan. 28." New York Times. January 22, 2006.
Lockard, Ray Anne. "Pink Papers and Lavender Files: Preserving Gay and Lesbian Art History in Archival Collections." Art Libraries Society of North America. Session 14. 26th Annual Conference. Philadelphia, Pa., March 10, 1998. Accessed November 3, 2007.
Robinson, Ruth. "Future Events From Art to Zippers." New York Times. April 25, 1982.
Sanchez, John. "Leslie-Lohman Gallery: The Ultimate Gay Portfolio." Genre Magazine. September 2000.
Saslow, James M. Pictures and Passions. A History of Homosexuality in the Visual Arts. New York: Viking Press, 1999. 
Summers, Claude J., ed. The Queer Encyclopedia of the Visual Arts. San Francisco: Cleis Press, 2004. 
Twomey, Chris. "The Culture of Queer: A Tribute to J.B. Harter." New York Art World. September 2006.

External links

LGBT arts organizations
Museums in Manhattan
Art museums and galleries in New York City
2016 establishments in New York City
SoHo, Manhattan
Historiography of LGBT in New York City
LGBT museums and archives
Art museums established in 2016
LGBT art in the United States
Charities based in New York City